HRMS may refer to:
 Human resource management system
 High-resolution mass spectrometry
 His/Her Dutch Majesty's Ship